The Eccles Building, at 385 24th St. in Ogden, Utah, was built in 1913.  It was listed on the National Register of Historic Places in 1982.

It was designed in Chicago school style by architect Leslie S. Hodgson.

It is an eight-story steel-framed building, designed in Commercial Style.

References

National Register of Historic Places in Weber County, Utah
Chicago school (architecture)
Buildings and structures completed in 1913